T-box transcription factor TBX19 is a protein that in humans is encoded by the TBX19 gene.

This gene is a member of a phylogenetically conserved family of genes that share a common DNA-binding domain, the T-box. T-box genes encode transcription factors involved in the regulation of developmental processes. 
This gene is the human ortholog of mouse Tbx19/Tpit gene. Studies in mouse show that Tpit protein is present only in the two pituitary pro-opiomelanocortin (POMC)-expressing lineages, the corticotrophs and melanotrophs. 

The Tpit gene is responsible for a neonatal form of acth deficiency and hypocortisolism.  

Mutations in the human ortholog were found in patients with isolated deficiency of pituitary POMC-derived ACTH, suggesting an essential role for this gene in differentiation of the pituitary POMC lineage.

See also
 Adrenocorticotropic hormone deficiency

References

Further reading

External links
 

Transcription factors